Theodore Barcroft L. Moonemalle (born 1868) was a Ceylonese lawyer and legislator. He was the Kandyan Sinhalese member of the Legislative Council of Ceylon.

Born in Kurunagala to John M. L. Moonemalle a proctor, he educated at Trinity College, Kandy and became a proctor of the District Court of Kurunagala in 1890. In 1897, he passed the exams to become a proctor of the Supreme Court. He served on several occasions as the acting district judge, commissioner of requests and police magistrate of Kurunagala. In 1906, he was appointed to the Legislative Council of Ceylon.

His daughter was Lady Lucille Aluwihare, wife of Sir Richard Aluwihare, the first Ceylonese Inspector General of Police.

External links & References

Sri Lankan Buddhists
Members of the Legislative Council of Ceylon
Sinhalese politicians
Alumni of Trinity College, Kandy
Sinhalese lawyers
Ceylonese proctors